The Mystic River is a  estuary in the southeast corner of the U.S. state of Connecticut.  Its main tributary is Whitford Brook. It empties into Fishers Island Sound, dividing the village of Mystic, Connecticut between the towns of Groton and Stonington. Much of the river is tidal. The Mystic River was the location of three large shipbuilding firms during the 19th-century, and it is now the home of the Mystic Seaport maritime museum. The name Mystic is derived from the Pequot term "missi-tuk", describing a large river whose waters are driven into waves by tides or wind, according to the Mystic River Historical Society.

History

The Pequot Indians built a village called Siccanemos overlooking the western bank of the Mystic River, but it was destroyed during the Pequot War on May 26, 1637, the day of the Mystic massacre.

See also

List of rivers of Connecticut
Mystic Seaport
Mystic River Bascule Bridge

References

External links

Estuaries of Connecticut
Long Island Sound
Connecticut placenames of Native American origin
Rivers of New London County, Connecticut
Mystic, Connecticut
Rivers of Connecticut